Barnabás Varga (born 25 January 1994) is a Hungarian footballer currently playing for Paksi FC.

References

External links
 

1994 births
Living people
Hungarian footballers
SV Mattersburg players
SV Lafnitz players
Gyirmót FC Győr players
Austrian Football Bundesliga players
2. Liga (Austria) players
Nemzeti Bajnokság II players
Hungarian expatriate footballers
Hungarian expatriate sportspeople in Austria
Expatriate footballers in Austria
Association football forwards
Sportspeople from Szombathely